The Bosnia and Herzegovina women's national volleyball team represents Bosnia and Herzegovina in international women's volleyball competitions and friendly matches.

Tournament record

World Championship

European Championship

References

External links
Official Website
 Volleyball Association of Bosnia and Herzegovina

National women's volleyball teams
Volleyball
Volleyball in Bosnia and Herzegovina